William Wilson House, also known as Prospect Hill and the Trammell Hollis House, is a historic home located in Gerrardstown, Berkeley County, West Virginia. It was built between 1792 and 1802, and is a large, two story brick dwelling on a stone foundation in a late-Georgian style. The interior features a mural by Baltimore artist Olive Verna Rogers painted in 1936. The property includes four brick outbuildings dated as far back as the 1850s: a kitchen, spring house, privy, and the original stone dwelling house.

The house was listed on the National Register of Historic Places in 1984.

See also
Mary Park Wilson House

References

External links

Houses on the National Register of Historic Places in West Virginia
Historic American Buildings Survey in West Virginia
Georgian architecture in West Virginia
Houses completed in 1792
Houses in Berkeley County, West Virginia
National Register of Historic Places in Berkeley County, West Virginia
Slave cabins and quarters in the United States